The 2022 Malta International Women's Football Tournament was the second edition of the Malta International Football Tournament, an invitational women's football tournament held annually in Malta. It took place from 16 to 22 February 2022.

Teams
Three teams were participating.

Squads

Standings

Results
All times are local (UTC+1)

Goalscorers

References

Malta International Football Tournament
Malta International Football Tournament
Malta International Football Tournament
Malta International Football Tournament